A  (Spanish for bridge) is a holiday in Spain, it is the day off to bridge the time between the weekend and a holiday, thereby creating a long weekend. Some businesses will close down altogether.

In 2012, the Spanish government led by Mariano Rajoy, as it was faced with the eurozone crisis, initiated measures to move public holidays to Mondays and Fridays. The aim of the measure was to avoid puentes. Gayle Allard, an economist at IE Business School has said that the measure can improve productivity. The Spanish Catholic Church opposed the measure, which would shuffle the day of the Feast of the Immaculate Conception.

In some years, such as 2022, December 6 (Constitution Day) falls on a Tuesday and December 8 (feast of the Immaculate Conception) falls on a Thursday. Thus, a period of 9 consecutive days has only three work days.
Some workers take a very long weekend by asking just one, two or three days off.

References

Public holidays in Spain
Metaphors referring to objects
Bridges